Nonstop is a South Korean sitcom that broadcast its first season in 2000 on MBC. It continued with 5 more seasons. The series was popular for its cast of teen idols, many who debuted through the show gaining vast popularity.

Cast

(Nonstop)

 Jennifer Lee
 Lee Min-woo
 Yang Dong-geun
 Lee Jae-eun
 Go Soo
 Kim Jung-hyun
 Kim Hyo-jin
 Baek Il-seob
 Kim Hyung-ja
 Yeon Jung-hoon
 Kim Ji-young

(NEW Nonstop)

Returning cast
 Jennifer Lee (season 1)
 Lee Min-woo (season 1)
 Yang Dong-geun (season 1)

New cast

 Zo In-sung
 Jeong Da-bin
 Park Kyung-lim
 Chun Jung-myung
 Jang Na-ra
 Kim Young-joon
 Lee Do-eun
 Yang Mi-ra
 Lee Kyung-kyu
 Kim Jung-hwa
 Seo Kwon-soon
 Kim Ki-hyun
 g.o.d

Special Guest
 Kim Sung-eun (ep. 399 and 405)

(Nonstop 3)

Returning cast
 Kim Hyo-jin (season 1)
 Jeong Da-bin (season 2)
 Kim Jung-hwa (season 2)

New cast

 Choi Min-yong
 Jung Tae-woo
 Ha Dong-hoon
 Jo Han-sun
 Yeo Wook-hwan
 Lee Jin
 Kim Young-ah
 Lim Ju-hwan
 Jung Won-joong
 Dana
 Son Dam-bi
 Hwang Ji-hyun
 Kim Ji-hoon
 Jo Sung-gil
 Kwon Se-eun

(Nonstop 4)

Returning cast
 Jo Sung-gil (season 3)

New cast

 Andy Lee
 Hyun Bin
 Jang Keun-suk
 Oh Seung-eun
 Han Ye-seul
 Lee Young-eun
 Lee Yoon-ji
 Yoon Jong-shin
 MC Mong
 Bong Tae-gyu
 Ye Hak-yong
 Kim Bo-ri
 Jun Jin
 Kim Jae-seung
 Jung Sung-woon
 Lee Yoo-jung
 Kim Hyo-seo
 Han Yeo-reum
 Jin Seo-yun
 Choi Ji-yun
 Jang Mi-inae

Special guest
 Lee Joon-gi
 Yoon Jung-hee
 Jang Na-ra (Episode 113)

(Nonstop 5)

Returning cast
 Choi Ji-yun (season 4)

New cast

 Kim Yong-man
 Jung Hyung-don
 Lee Jung
 Kang Kyung-joon
 Park Jin-woo
 Lee Min-woo
 Tablo
 Jo Jung-rin
 Lee Seung-gi
 Koo Hye-sun
 Hong Soo-ah
 Han Hyo-joo

Special guests

 Song Ha-yoon
 Lee Min-ho
 MC Mong
 Chae Young-in
 Kim Bo-ri
 Seo Ji-hee
 Kim Ji-seok
 Jin Goo
 Kim Ji-woo
 Jang Ah-young
 Jang Mi-inae
 Jung Joo-hee
 SS501
 Kim Ki-hyun
 Han Ye-seul

(Rainbow Romance)

New cast

 Kang Eun-bi
 Kim Ki-bum
 Kim Hee-chul
 Lee Min-ki
 Jung Eui-chul
 Hwang Bo-ra
 Suh Jae-kyung
 Park Hee-von
 Kim Hyung-min
 Lee Sang-mi
 Noh Hong-chul
 Park Hee-jin
 Uhm Hyun-kyung
 Chun Myung-hoon
 Kim Chang-wan
 Lim Eun-kyung
 Lee Ahyumi
 Go Eun-ah
 Yoon Eun-hye
 Yoon Do-hyun
 Lee Ji-ah

Special guests

 Park Soo-jin
 Ha Dong-hoon
 Seo Ji-young
 Park Myung-soo
 Han Geng
 Eunhyuk 
 TVXQ
 Bae Seul-ki
 Kim Hyo-jin
 Jang Mi-inae
 Choi Won-joon
 Lee Eun-jung
 Yoon Seung-ah
 Jung Ji-in
 Sung Eun
 Ahn Sang-tae
 Choi Jin-hyuk

Awards

Notes

References

External links
 

South Korean television sitcoms
Korean-language television shows
2000 South Korean television series debuts
2006 South Korean television series endings
MBC TV television dramas
South Korean comedy television series
South Korean romance television series
Television series about teenagers